Mangi may refer to:

People 
 A kind of chiefship found among the Chaga tribe of Tanzania
 Mangi Mahal (fl. 1998–2019), popular Punjabi folk singer
 Mangi Meli (died in 1900), leader of the Chaga in the 1890s
 Mangiis a surname of sindhi tradition family

Places 
 Mangi, Jalgaon district, Maharashtra, India
 Mangi, Solapur district, Maharashtra, India
 Mangi, Iran (disambiguation)
 Mangi or Manzi, a name for Southern China as distinct from Cathay during the Yuan dynasty
 Mangi live mostly in Sindh Pakistan.

See also 
 Mangi Dam (disambiguation)
 Mangy (disambiguation)
 Mangi-Tungi, a twin-pinnacled peak near Tahrabad, Maharashtra, India
 Manji (disambiguation)
 Manzi (disambiguation)